Vignetting the Compost is an album by Bibio, released on 3 February 2009 on Mush Records in the United States and on 4 March 2009 on And Records, an imprint of Youth Inc.

Track listing

References 

2009 albums
Bibio albums